Hilary Christiane Mary Charlesworth  (born 28 February 1955) is an Australian international lawyer. She has been a Judge of the International Court of Justice since 5 November 2021, and is Harrison Moore Professor of Law and Melbourne Laureate Professor at the University of Melbourne, and Distinguished Professor at the Australian National University.

Education and career

Charlesworth holds degrees from Melbourne and Harvard Law Schools, and is a barrister and solicitor of the Supreme Court of Victoria. She has served as editorial board member of many legal publications, including the American Journal of International Law, Melbourne University Law Review and the Asian Journal of International Law.

In addition to her academic appointments, she is active in civil society organisations. In 2011, she was appointed as an ad hoc judge of the International Court of Justice in the Whaling in the Antarctic Case (Australia v. Japan).

In 2020, Guyana appointed Charlesworth as an ad hoc judge in the Arbitral Award of 3 October 1899 Case (Guyana v Venezuela) in the International Court of Justice. In 2021, the Australian Government supported the Australian National Group's nomination of Professor Hilary Charlesworth for election as a Judge of the International Court of Justice to fill the vacant position resulting from the death of the Australian judge, James Richard Crawford, who died 31 May 2021. Crawford's term was due to conclude on 5 February 2024. Charlesworth was elected as a judge of the court on 5 November 2021, with immediate effect; she was sworn in as a judge on 7 December 2021.

Works
 Weston, B., Falk, R.A. & Charlesworth, H. 1997, International Law and World Order, 3rd edn, West Publishing Co., Minneapolis
 Charlesworth H. & Chinkin C. 2000, The Boundaries of International Law, Manchester University Press, Manchester (Winner, American Society of International Law Certificate of Merit 2001 for "preeminent contribution to creative scholarship")
 Charlesworth, H. 2002, Writing in Rights: Australia and the Protection of Human Rights, UNSW Press, Sydney
 Weston, B., Falk, R.A., Charlesworth, H. & Strauss, A.L. 2006, International Law and World Order: A Problem Oriented Coursebook, 4th edn, West Publishing Co., Minneapolis
 Charlesworth, H., Chiam, M., Hovell, D. & Williams G. 2006, No Country is an Island : Australia and International Law, UNSW Press, Sydney (Highly Commended in Arts Non-Fiction category, 2006 Human Rights and Equal Opportunity Commission Human Rights Awards)
Byrnes, A., Charlesworth, H. & McKinnon, G. 2009, Australian Bills of Rights: History, Politics, Law, UNSW Press, Sydney

Awards and recognition
 Charlesworth's book (co-authored with Christine Chinkin) entitled The Boundaries of International Law: A Feminist Analysis was awarded the Certificate of Merit by the American Society of International Law in 2001.
 In 2001 she was inducted into the Victorian Honour Roll of Women.
 Elected Fellow of the Academy of the Social Sciences in Australia, 2003.
 Appointed Fellow of the Australian Academy of Law, 2004.
 In 2006, her contributions to the body of international law scholarship earned her the American Society of International Law's Goler T. Butcher Medal, and its award was recorded by Hansard in the ACT Legislative Assembly. 
 Appointed a Member of the Order of Australia (AM) in the 2007 Australia Day Honours for "For service to international and human rights law through professional and supporting roles in academia, legal organisations, government bodies and non-government organisations in Australia and internationally, and through the encouragement of human rights dialogue, particularly in the area of women's rights".
 Australian Laureate Fellowship (2010)

References

Lectures
 Feminist Analysis of International Law in the Lecture Series of the United Nations Audiovisual Library of International Law

External links
 Centre for International Governance & Justice (CIGJ)
 The Institute for Migrant Rights
 The American Society of International Law

1955 births
Living people
Australian feminist writers
Academic staff of the Australian National University
International Court of Justice judges
International law scholars
University of Melbourne alumni
Melbourne Law School alumni
Academic staff of the University of Melbourne
University of Melbourne women
Harvard Law School alumni
Members of the Order of Australia
Fellows of the Australian Academy of Law
Fellows of the Academy of the Social Sciences in Australia
Members of the Institut de Droit International